Wanakena Presbyterian Church, also known as Mount Lebanon Presbyterian Church and Western Adirondack Presbyterian Church, is a historic Presbyterian church located at Wanakena in St. Lawrence County, New York. It was built in 1903 and is a "steepled ell" plan with its steepled entry tower located at the intersection of the two volumes.  The tower has a louvered belfry topped by a pyramidal roof.

Its design is attributed to church plan catalogue architect Benjamin D. Price.

It was listed on the National Register of Historic Places in 2007.

References

Churches on the National Register of Historic Places in New York (state)
Presbyterian churches in New York (state)
Churches completed in 1903
20th-century Presbyterian church buildings in the United States
Churches in St. Lawrence County, New York
National Register of Historic Places in St. Lawrence County, New York